Deadline was a British comics magazine published between 1988 and 1995.

Created by 2000 AD artists Brett Ewins and Steve Dillon, Deadline featured a mix of comic strips and written articles aimed at adult readers. Deadline sat at the forefront of the wave of British comics anthologies for mature audiences that included Crisis, Revolver and Toxic!, and had a cultural influence beyond the comics world, most notably via its breakout star Tank Girl. Deadline was published by Deadline Publications Ltd.

History
The magazine's origins lie in the earlier publication Strange Days, an anthology title created by Ewins, Brendan McCarthy and Peter Milligan.

Much of the non-strip content centred on alternative and indie music. Coupled with the subversive nature of many of the comic strips, the magazine had a distinctive counterculture ethos and post-punk sensibility.

The magazine was owned and financed by Tom Astor (grandson of Nancy Astor), and initially edited by Steve Dillon and Brett Ewins before transferring editorship to Dave Elliott, then Si Spencer and finally Frank Wynne (a former staff member of Crisis and subsequently translator of Michel Houellebecq). Alongside original material, Elliott and Wynne also introduced reprints of American alternative comics such as Love and Rockets, Bob Burden's Flaming Carrot and Evan Dorkin strips such as Milk and Cheese. Elliott also arranged for content from the magazine to be reprinted in the US by Dark Horse Comics as Deadline USA.

Deadline enjoyed the patronage of those who would not normally purchase comics and the support of several key bands of the time, with Blur making regular appearances in the Tank Girl strips (Tank Girl artist Jamie Hewlett was good friends with Blur's Damon Albarn), and covers including Ride, Curve, Carter USM and the Senseless Things. However, the commercial failure of the Tank Girl film and the crossing over of the alternative scene into the mainstream (around the time of Britpop, a movement it had helped to champion) saw the magazine eventually fold at the end of 1995.

In the late 2000s, Alan Grant edited the title Wasted, which owed much to the style and ethos of Deadline a decade and a half earlier.

Comic strips published in Deadline (selected) 
 Tank Girl, created by the young team of writer Alan Martin and artist Jamie Hewlett
 Johnny Nemo by Brett Ewins and Peter Milligan
 Wired World, by Philip Bond
 Planet Swerve, by Alan Martin and Glyn Dillon
 Hugo Tate, by Nick Abadzis
 Cheeky Wee Budgie Boy, created and written by Jon Beeston, and drawn by Beeston and Philip Bond
 Timulo, by D'Israeli
 A-Men, by Shaky Kane
 Space Boss, by Shaky Kane
 Exit by Nabiel Kanan
 several early works by Al Columbia
 Box City, Ruby Chan by Rachael Ball

References

Notes

Sources

External links
 Tank-Girl.com (Official home of all things Tank Girl)
 Online version of the Deadline strip Sadist

1988 comics debuts
British underground comics
Comics magazines published in the United Kingdom
Magazines established in 1988
Magazines disestablished in 1995
Defunct magazines published in the United Kingdom
English-language magazines